The Tomb of the Unknown Soldier is a war memorial, dedicated to the Syrian soldiers killed during battle. It is visited every year by the President of Syria on Martyrs' Day (May 6).

Two Quran verses are engraved into the monument:

See also 
 Tomb of the Unknown Soldier

References

Tombs of Unknown Soldiers
Monuments and memorials in Damascus
Mausoleums in Syria
Buildings and structures completed in 1985